Duson is a town in Acadia and Lafayette parishes in the U.S. state of Louisiana. The town was named after Curley Duson, a sheriff of St. Landry Parish. At the 2010 U.S. census, the town had a population of 1,716; in 2020, at the population estimates program, its population was 1,761. The Lafayette Parish portion of Duson is part of the Lafayette metropolitan statistical area, while the Acadia Parish portion is part of the Crowley micropolitan statistical area.

History

Originally known as "Duson Station", the town was laid out by J.G. Parkerson, general manager of the Louisiana Western Railroad. By August 30, 1880, the railroad line from New Orleans to Houston was completed, and passenger and freight service began. It merged with the Southern Pacific Railroad in 1900. The village of Duson was incorporated on December 16, 1909, named after the land developer Curley Duson, and installed Adolph De Jean as the first mayor.

In 1927, St. Theresa Catholic Church was completed. Cotton farming was the main agriculture for the area. Three cotton gins were in Duson until the mid-1960s. Fires destroyed two and the third was torn down. After World War II, small lots east of Duson were developed, with small houses using brick siding paper on the exterior.  Because of that, the area became known as "Paper Town."

Geography
Duson is located at  (30.241464, -92.184419), in the Acadiana region of southern Louisiana.

Demographics

As of the 2020 United States census, there were 1,326 people, 586 households, and 415 families residing in the town. At the 2019 American Community Survey, the racial and ethnic makeup of the town was 56.7% non-Hispanic white, 38.0% Black and African American, 0.4% American Indian or Alaska Native, 1.0% two or more races, and 3.9% Hispanic and Latin American of any race. Of the population, 13.7% spoke a language other than English at home, and the median age was 31.2. In 2019, the township had a median household income of $27,604 and males had a median income of $38,403 versus $26,029 for females.

At the 2000 United States census, there were 1,672 people, 644 households, and 452 families residing in the town. The racial makeup of the town was 73.98% White, 25.24% African American, 0.06% Native American, 0.06% from other races, and 0.66% from two or more races. Hispanic or Latin Americans of any race were 0.36% of the population.

There were 644 households, out of which 38.2% had children under the age of 18 living with them, 41.6% were married couples living together, 20.5% had a female householder with no husband present, and 29.7% were non-families. 25.3% of all households were made up of individuals, and 8.9% had someone living alone who was 65 years of age or older. The average household size was 2.59 and the average family size was 3.07.

In the town, the population was spread out, with 30.0% under the age of 18, 10.5% from 18 to 24, 29.3% from 25 to 44, 19.6% from 45 to 64, and 10.6% who were 65 years of age or older. The median age was 32 years. For every 100 females, there were 93.3 males. For every 100 females age 18 and over, there were 85.1 males.

The median income for a household in the town was $21,071, and the median income for a family was $24,886. Males had a median income of $26,250 versus $15,476 for females. The per capita income for the town was $10,520. About 27.5% of families and 31.5% of the population were below the poverty line, including 42.7% of those under age 18 and 29.5% of those age 65 or over.

Festivals
Like many other towns and cities in the Acadiana region, Duson has a local Mardi Gras celebration that includes a parade through the town. Many residents of nearby Lafayette, Scott and Rayne will converge on the town, as most parades in the region are scheduled as to not occur simultaneously.

Notable residents
Sheri Sam, a WNBA veteran.

References

External links
 Town of Duson official website

Populated places established in 1909
Towns in Louisiana
Towns in Lafayette Parish, Louisiana
Towns in Acadia Parish, Louisiana
Towns in Lafayette metropolitan area, Louisiana

Acadiana
1909 establishments in Louisiana